Tatyana Lartseva (born 9 October 1982) is a Russian sailor. She competed in the Yngling event at the 2004 Summer Olympics.

References

External links
 

1982 births
Living people
Russian female sailors (sport)
Olympic sailors of Russia
Sailors at the 2004 Summer Olympics – Yngling
People from Dolgoprudny
Sportspeople from Moscow Oblast